Atsugama may refer to:
 The Japanese name for the Japanese maple tree Acer palmatum
 Japanese recording artist Atsugama, who specializes in the tsugaru-shamisen